The Ancestress (German: Die Ahnfrau) is a 1919 Austrian silent drama film directed by Jacob Fleck and Luise Fleck and starring Liane Haid, Max Neufeld and Karl Ehmann. The same story had previously been shot in 1910.

The film's sets were designed by the art director Alfred Meschkan.

Plot

Cast 
 Liane Haid – Tochter Berta
 Max Neufeld – Jaromir von Eschen
 Karl Ehmann – Graf Zdenko von Borotin
 Eugen Neufeld – Hauptmann
 Josef Recht – Räuber Boleslav
 Eduard Sekler – Kastellan

References

Bibliography 
 Parish, Robert. Film Actors Guide. Scarecrow Press, 1977.

External links 

1919 films
Austrian silent feature films
Films directed by Jacob Fleck
Films directed by Luise Fleck
1919 drama films
Austrian drama films
Austrian films based on plays
Austrian black-and-white films
Films based on works by Franz Grillparzer
Silent drama films
1910s German-language films